Murilo Gomes Ferreira or just Murilo Gomes (born 19 June 1990 in São Paulo), is a Brazilian footballer who plays as a centre back.

Career 
He started at Corinthians, where he played up, but in 2005 went to the Palmeiras.

In 2008 debuted for Palmeiras.

References

External links 
 

1990 births
Living people
Brazilian footballers
Sociedade Esportiva Palmeiras players
FC Karpaty Lviv players
Clube Atlético Bragantino players
Brazilian expatriate footballers
Expatriate footballers in Ukraine
Brazilian expatriate sportspeople in Ukraine
Association football defenders
Footballers from São Paulo